The Lysistrata Project may refer to:
 The Lysistrata Project (protest), a 2003 peace protest in reaction to the Iraq disarmament crisis
 The Lysistrata Project (radio drama), a contemporary adaptation of Aristophanes's play

See also 
 Lysistrata, the play by Aristophanes